Progressive Green Party may refer to:
 Groen (political party), Belgium, an independent Flemish progressive Green party
 Progressive Green Party (New Zealand), an environmentalist political party in New Zealand in the 1990s

See also
 Progressive Party (disambiguation)
 Green Party (disambiguation)
 Progress Party (disambiguation)